is an anime television series produced by Arms and directed by Yasuomi Umetsu. The series is a legal drama set in a world where ordinary humans co-exist with magic users, and magic users are represented in law by a subset of defense attorney (Bengoshi) called "wizard barristers" (Benmashi). The series follows Cecil Sudo, who has recently become the youngest wizard barrister in history. The series aired from January 12, 2014 to March 30, 2014.

Plot
In 2018, humans and wizards live together in Tokyo. Police continue to protect order in society, but wizards known as Wud are tried according to magical law via Magic Prohibition Law, in special courts defended by wizard barristers via the Court for Magic. Half-Japanese, half-Canadian Cecile Sudo has just become the youngest wizard barrister and begins work at the Butterfly Law Office. While she has not realized it yet, she has tremendous magical potential.

Characters

Butterfly Law Office

 

She is the main protagonist. She is a Japanese Canadian. At 15 years old, she passed the national bar and at age 17, became the youngest wizard barrister in history. She has blue eyes and shoulder-length purple hair, mostly in two braids with multi-colored spherical beads at the ends, which shatter and have to be replaced when she uses her magic. She wears a loud colored "battle dress" including a miniskirt and rides a scooter. Her motive for becoming a wizard barrister is to rescue her mother Megumi from the death penalty. She has several magic powers, unlike most Wuds who only have one, which include manipulation of metal, fire and sand. Her most notable power is forming a giant robot vehicle called the "Diaboloid" from metal near her. 

She has long black hair and brown eyes. She joined the law firm on the same day as Cecil and is initially jealous of Cecil's reputation as a wizard barrister. Eventually, after learning that Cecil intends to rescue Megumi from the death penalty, Natsuna becomes friends with Cecil. Her magic is taming dust and sand.

Mitsuhisa is a prosecutor of the Court of Magic, but resigns when he awakened as a wizard and joins the law firm. He has long white hair and green eyes. His magic is to create fast streams of water from thin air. He works alongside Cecil in a murder case, in which a girl named Mayu Saotome killed a manager named Ken Oizumi, who killed his employee and Mayu's lover Masato Namase.

 She is a paralegal assistant rather than a wizard barrister. She is Lucifer in human form, despite being female, and is attracted to Cecil. She has short black hair and bright yellow eyes. The back of her black and red jacket shows a skull under the words "GO TO HELL". As an archangel, she has many magic powers which she hides. Most often, Moyo can sense where Cecil is at all times, secretly protecting her from dangerous situations.

She has short yellow-green hair, blue eyes and is a kind person. Her magic is manipulating wind into large gusts and blasts.

She has long brown hair, brown eyes with a voluptuous body and ample bosom. She is often seen wearing an orange and black low-cut long shirt and black form fitting skirt. She loves to make lewd puns accompanied by lewd actions like aggressively fondling her own breasts. Her magic is divination, or precognition, by the use of tarot cards.

The leader of the law firm. She has long orange hair and green eyes and uses two hairpins which look like butterflies. Although she has no magical abilities, she is clever and quick thinking.

He is the Ageha's partner and brother in the law firm. He has blue hair that sticks out to the side and then curls under and inward and yellow eyes. He is very stern, especially to Cecil. His magic is creating human-size robots.

She is the receptionist and computer operator of the law firm. She has long brown hair and brown eyes. Although she does not have magical abilities, her skills to quickly and accurately analyze and process any kind of information are supreme, for which she is extremely appreciated and respected.

He is the slow but clever old man of the law firm. He wears brown suits and has light green hair. His magic is illusions, such as making one person look like another. He first worked with Cecil on a murder case, in which a bowling alley manager named Takuma Kiritani was knifed by his employee Hiroyuki Suzui.

Shark Knight Law Office

He has yellow hair and brown eyes. He is part of the Labone, a pro-human group of Wuds, and seeks to protect Cecil from the Macal, an anti-human organization of Wuds.

He has brown hair and green eyes. His magic power is using words to make people act against their will for a brief period.

Metropolitan Police Department

He is the assistant and partner of Quinn. He is secretly and illegally a Wud, sub-leader of the Macal and the son of Makusu. He uses a gun as a weapon. He has light brown hair and brown eyes. He cares deeply for Cecil, despite his involvement with the Macal.

She is the partner of Shizumu. She has long orange hair, brown eyes and smokes cigarettes. Although she has no magic abilities, she uses a gun as a weapon.

Familiars

He is Cecil's familiar, who resembles an anthropomorphic frog. He has a perverted personality and tries to sexually assault Cecil and makes suggestive remarks. He is also revealed to be a very skillful cook.

She is Mitsuhisa's familiar, who resembles an anthropomorphic pig.

She is Tsunomi's familiar, who resembles an anthropomorphic chicken.

Other characters

He is the current president of the Court of Magic. He has dark brown hair and brown eyes.

Megumi is Cecil Sudo's mother. During Cecil's childhood, she and her daughter are held hostage at the roof of an apartment, where a police officer named Kyosuke Oda opens fire and inadvertently hits Cecil with a stray bullet. Megumi uses fire magic and kills Oda in response, desperate to take her daughter to the hospital. She is put on death row. She has purple hair and brown eyes.

He is the chief justice of the Supreme Court. He is secretly and illegally a Wud, the head of Macal and the father of Shizumu. He has brown hair and brown eyes. He attempted to summon Lucifer using Cecil as a catalyst, but Shizumu prevents that from happening.

He is the prosecutor for Megumi and Makusu's cases, and he is a conspirator with Makusu. He has dark brown hair.

He is Cecil's first client, who is falsely accused of belonging to the Wud robbery gang "No Face" and killing a fellow gang member. He is actually defending himself and a bank employee named Keiko Endo of whom he loves. He has brown hair.

Terminology

Magic Prohibition Law
The  is a special law restricting the use of magic, which Wuds are subject to. Its articles include:

Article 1: Magic use against penal, civil, or commercial codes is prohibited.
Article 2: Those using magic illegally are tried in the Court of Magic.
Article 3: In the Court of Magic, wizard barristers protect wizards' rights.
Article 4: Wizard barristers protect wizards' basic rights.
Article 5: One who has awakened to magic must be registered immediately.
Article 6: It is prohibited for a public office to hire registered wizards.
Article 7: The Court of Magic holds only a single, fast trial.
Article 8: If a familiar breaks the law, the owner is held responsible.
Article 9: Creation or use of metallic mobile mecha is generally prohibited.
Article 10: Magic used for social justice is permitted.

Media

Light novel
A light novel entitled , written by Michiko Itou and illustrated by Yasuomi Umetsu was published March 3, 2014 by Pony Canyon. The novel depicts the early life of Cecil Sudo, before becoming a barrister.

Anime
The anime series produced by studio Arms, written and directed by Yasuomi Umetsu with scripts by Michiko Itou, and aired in Japan between January 12, 2014 and March 30, 2014. The series premiered on Tokyo MX on January 12, 2014 and was subsequently aired on Sun TV, KBS, TV Aichi, AT-X and BS11. The anime was simulcasted in English on Crunchyroll and licensed by Sentai Filmworks for North America. The opening theme song "Justitia" is performed by Lia and the ending theme song "Blue Topaz" by Rui Tanabe.

Episode list

References

External links
  
 

Fiction set in 2018
Arms Corporation
Anime with original screenplays
Tokyo MX original programming
Wizards in television
Sentai Filmworks
Supernatural anime and manga